Ohwobeno Osemudiamen A.M. Obano (born 25 October 1994) is an English professional rugby union player who plays as a prop for Bath.

Personal life
Obano was born in Peckham and grew up in East Dulwich. He played in the 1st XV at The London Oratory School before winning a scholarship to Dulwich College. Whilst at Dulwich Obano was a two-time winner of the Schools Cup.

He is also the cousin of England lock, Maro Itoje. Obano has a nickname Sinny.

Club career
Obano was previously a member of the Wasps Academy. In the summer of 2014 he joined Bath. Obano had a loan spell with Coventry during the 2014–15 National League 1 season. In February 2015, Obano made his first Premiership appearance for Bath against the Exeter Chiefs.

International career
A long-term back injury ruled Obano out of the 2014 Junior World Cup. In December 2017, Obano received his first England call up for the 34 man Six Nations training squad. He was called up for the Summer tour to South Africa in 2018 but was injured during camp. He played against Barbarians in summer 2019.

Obano received his first England cap during the opening round of the 2021 Six Nations Championship in their 6-11 loss to Scotland.

References

External links
Bath Profile
ESPN Scrum Profile

1994 births
Living people
Bath Rugby players
Black British sportspeople
Coventry R.F.C. players
England international rugby union players
English people of Nigerian descent
English rugby union players
People educated at Dulwich College
People educated at London Oratory School
Rugby union players from Camberwell
Rugby union props